Gambierdiscus pacificus is a species of toxic (ciguatoxin- and maitotoxin-like toxicity) dinoflagellate. It is 67–77 μm long and 60–76 μm wide dorsoventrally and its surface is smooth. It is identified by a four-sided apical pore plate surrounded by 30 round pores. Its first plate occupies 20% of the width of the hypotheca.

References

Further reading
Mai Anh, Nguyen Thi. "The morphology and growth characterizations of Gambierdiscus pacificus Chinain et Faust 1999." Journal of Biology 32.3 (2012): 36-43.

External links

AlgaeBase

Gonyaulacales
Species described in 1999